Wings Over Europe was a 1928 Broadway three-act play written by Robert Nichols and Maurice Browne, produced by the Theatre Guild and directed by Rouben Mamoulian. It opened on December 10, 1928 at the 
Martin Beck Theatre and then moved to the Alvin Theatre sometime in 1929  running for 90 total performances.

Young British genius Francis Lightfoot has discovered how to make terrible bombs using the atom. He's soon dismayed by the greed and militarism of the British cabinet members.

Cast

 Hugh Buckler as Stapp
 Frank Conroy as Arthur	
 Wheeler Dryden as	Plimsoll
 Frank Elliott as Dedham	
 Joseph Kilgour as	Grindle	
 Alexander Kirkland as Lightfoot
 Robert Rendel as Vere	
 Lionel Bevans as St. Man	
 Thomas Braidon as Cossington	
 Charles Carden as Taggert
 John Dunn as Sunningdale	
 Charles Francis as Faulkiner	
 George Graham as Pascoe	
 Nicholas Joy as Haliburton	
 A. P. Kaye as	Rummel	
 Ernest Lawford as Grantby	
 Edward Lester as Hand	
 Gordon Richards as Dunn	
 Grant Stewart as Blount

Accolades
Wings Over Europe was included in Burns Mantle's The Best Plays of 1928–29.

References

External links 
 

1928 plays
Broadway plays